Kosmos 197 ( meaning Cosmos 197), also known as DS-U2-V No.3, was a Soviet satellite which was launched in 1967 as part of the Dnepropetrovsk Sputnik programme. It was a  spacecraft, which was built by the Yuzhnoye Design Office, and was used to conduct classified technology development experiments for the Soviet armed forces.

A Kosmos-2I 63SM carrier rocket was used to launch Kosmos 197 into low Earth orbit. The launch took place from Site 86/4 at Kapustin Yar. The launch occurred at 09:01:59 GMT on 26 December 1967, and resulted in the successful insertion of the satellite into orbit. Upon reaching orbit, the satellite was assigned its Kosmos designation, and received the International Designator 1967-126A. The North American Air Defense Command assigned it the catalogue number 03079.

Kosmos 197 was the third of four DS-U2-V satellites to be launched. On 30 January 1968, it decayed from orbit and reentered the atmosphere.

See also

 1967 in spaceflight

References

Spacecraft launched in 1967
Kosmos satellites
1967 in the Soviet Union
Dnepropetrovsk Sputnik program